Perisphinctoidea, formerly Perisphinctaceae, is a superfamily of Middle Jurassic (Bajocian) to Lower Cretaceous (Barremian) ammonites, commonly with evolute shells with  strong ribbing that typically divides about mid flank before crossing the venter.

Classification
Some 16 families have been recognized in the Perisphinctoidea.  The following is based on Donovan et al. 1981 with modification from the Treatise on Invertebrate Paleontology, Part L (1957)
 
Perisphinctidae:  Middle and Upper Jurassic root stock, derived from the Stephanoceratidae

(Middle Jurassic direct derivatives of the  Perisphinctidae)
Morphiceratidae
Tulitidae
Reineckeiidae
Pachyceratidae
Aspidoceratidae

(early Upper Jurassic (Oxfordian) derivatives of Perisphinctidae)
Aulacostephanidae
Ataxioceratidae

(mid Upper Jurassic (Kimmeridgian) derivatives of the Ataxioceratidae)
Dorsoplanitidae
Virgatitidae

(late Upper Jurassic (Tithonian)  derivatives of Perisphinctidae) 
Simoceratidae
Himalayitidae
Olcostephanidae
Holcodiscidae (indirect, from Olcostaphanidae)(now placed in the suberfamily Desmoceratoidea)

(Lower Cretaceous Perisphinctoidea (Berriasan - Hauterivien) 
Berriasellidae (derived from Ataxioceratidae)(now considered a subfamily of Neocomitidae)
Polytichitidae [=Craspeditidae] (derived from Dorsoplanitidae)
Neocomitidae (derived from Berriasellidae)(now placed in the superfamily  Endemoceratoidea)
Oosterellidae (Hauterivian derivative of the Neocomitidae)

References

 
Ammonitina
Prehistoric animal superfamilies
Bajocian first appearances
Early Cretaceous extinctions